William Gilliam (1841 – January 23, 1893) was an American Republican politician who served as a member of the Virginia House of Delegates, representing Prince George County from 1871 to 1875. He was one of the first African-Americans to serve in Virginia's government.

See also
African-American officeholders during and following the Reconstruction era

References

External links

1841 births
1893 deaths
African-American politicians during the Reconstruction Era
African-American state legislators in Virginia
Republican Party members of the Virginia House of Delegates
19th-century American politicians
People from Prince George County, Virginia